Detroit Lakes High School is a public high school located in  Detroit Lakes, Minnesota, United States. It serves approximately 870 students and is a part of the Detroit Lakes Public Schools system. The school colors are red and white and the athletic teams are known as "The Lakers". It is the largest high school in Becker County. The original school was Holmes School(K-12), founded 1895, named after Elon G. Holmes. In 1980, Holmes school was turned into the Historic Holmes theater and the Detroit Lakes Community and Cultural Center, and Detroit lakes high school was formed.

Notable alumni
 Jeff Johnson, Class of 1985, former state representative and 2014 Republican gubernatorial nominee
 Julius J. Olson, DLHS Class of 1897 (Original Holmes School), Minnesota Supreme Court justice
 Adam Thielen, DLHS Class of 2008, NFL wide receiver, Minnesota Vikings

References

External links
 Detroit Lakes High School Website
 Detroit Lakes Public Schools Website
 Historic Holmes Theater history website

Schools in Becker County, Minnesota
Educational institutions in the United States with year of establishment missing
Public high schools in Minnesota